The 1985 Estonian SSR Football Championship was won by Pärnu Kalakombinaat/MEK.

League table

References

Estonian Football Championship
Est
Football